Tony Fox may refer to:

 Tony Fox (rower) (1928–2010), Guernsey-born doctor and rower 
 Tony Fox (rugby union)  (born c. 1934), Australian rugby union player 
 Tony Fox (Australian rules footballer) (born 1958), Australian footballer for Footscray

See also
Tony Fox Sales (born 1951), American bass guitarist